Solanum cinnamomeum is a species of plant in the family Solanaceae. It is endemic to Brazil. Although considered to be at low risk of extinction, its survival depends on conservation.

References

cinnamomeum
Endemic flora of Brazil
Flora of the Atlantic Forest
Conservation dependent plants
Near threatened flora of South America
Taxonomy articles created by Polbot